A Way in the World is a 1994 book by Nobel laureate V. S. Naipaul.  Although it was marketed as a novel in America, A Way in the World, which consists of linked narratives, is arguably something different.

Novel or sequence?
Despite his achievements as a novelist, in later life Naipaul has described the novel as an outmoded form. A Way in the World was published in the UK with the sub-title "sequence", and this is reflected in British reviews.
In the USA it was published as a novel, apparently at the request of the American publisher.

Relationship to The Loss of El Dorado
A Way in the World is more fictional than Naipaul's earlier historical work The Loss of El Dorado (1969), which deals with some of the same material, for example the lives of Sir Walter Raleigh and Francisco de Miranda. Naipaul also includes autobiographical material, partly fictionalised, which was not in the earlier book.

Recognition
The book was short-listed for the International Dublin Literary Award.

References

1994 British novels
Novels by V. S. Naipaul
Alfred A. Knopf books